Ivan Ray Parker (born December 21, 1957) is an American Southern Gospel singer.

Musical career

Ivan Parker was raised in Sanford, North Carolina, where his father was a pastor in a Pentecostal church. In 1982, Parker joined the Singing Americans, and in 1983 he became lead vocalist of the Dove Award-winning group the Gold City Quartet. As a member of Gold City, he was named Favorite Lead Vocalist by Singing News from 1988 to 1993, and was named Favorite Male Vocalist from 1989 to 1995 and 1997. He was inducted into the Alabama Music Hall of Fame in 1993.

In January 1994, Parker began recording as a solo artist, and in 1995 he joined Bill and Gloria Gaither on the "Homecoming" tour. He continued touring with the Gaithers for 16 years. Occasionally, he would sing with tenor Kirk Talley, and pianist/baritone Anthony Burger in a group they called simply The Trio. From 2001 to 2004 and 2006 to 2016, The Singing News named him Favorite Soloist. In 2007 and 2008, he was voted Male Vocalist of the Year in the Singing News Fan Awards.

Parker's 2008 compilation The Best of Ivan Parker: From the Homecoming Series reached #188 on the Billboard 200. Parker described his 2019 release, Feels Like Home, as having "more of a vintage sound".

Personal life 
Parker is married to Theresa, and they have two sons: Josh and Ryan. Josh sometimes performs with his father on tour.

In the summer of 2021, Parker was diagnosed with metastatic squamous cell carcinoma.

The Trio members

Line-ups

Discography

With the Singing Americans
1982: Exciting Sound of the Singing Americans
1982: Sensational Singing Americans

With Gold City
1983: I Think I’ll Read It Again
1983: Hymns Sung by the Gold City Quartet
1983: Higher than the Moon
1984: Walking with Jesus
1984  Midnight Cry
1984: Walk On
1985: Sing with the Angels
1986: Double Take: Live
1986: Your Favorite Hymns
1987: Movin’ Up
1988: Portrait
1988: Voices of Christmas
1989: Favorite Hymns Volume 2
1989: Goin’ Home
1990: Windows of Home
1990: Instrumentals Volume 1
1990: Indiana Live
1991: 10 Year Celebration
1991: Answer the Call
1992: Kings Gold
1992: Pillars of Faith
1993: Kings Gold 2
1993: Acapella Gold

With The Trio
(Anthony Burger, Kirk Talley and Ivan Parker) 
The Trio (1998)
Back By Popular Demand (2001)
Havin' a Good Time! (2003)

Solo albums
1994: Faithful
1995: Mercy
1995: Greatest Hits
1996: Live! Night Of Praise (Ivan Parker Ministries)
1996: Days Gone By
1997: Journey To Forever (Zion Music Group)
1998: A Collection Of 20 Favorites (Homeland)
1999: Believe (Homeland)
2000: Vintage Homecoming (Ivan Parker Ministries)
2001: Merry Christmas From Ivan (Homeland)
2001: Be Blessed (Cathedral)
2002: It's True (Horizon)
2003: Just Imagine (Horizon)
2004: Redeemer (Horizon)
2005: Sing
2006: Under Grace (Horizon)
2007: That Was Then...This Is Now (Horizon)
2008: The Best of Ivan Parker (Gaither Music Group)
2008: Inseparable (Horizon)
2009: Unity (Horizon)
2010: Sing the Greatest Hits of Days Gone By (Horizon)
2011: Joyride (Horizon)
2012: Timeless Treasures (Horizon)
2015: Threads Of Mercy (Horizon)
2016: Dancing in the Rain
2018: Christmas Dreaming
2019: Feels Like Home

Video
2005: Requested LIVE
2007: The Best of Ivan Parker
2010: Exclusively LIVE

Gaither Homecoming Video Performances
1994: O Happy Day "Wait Till You See Me In My New Home
1995: Holy Ground "Saved by the Hands"
1995: Ryman Gospel Reunion "Farther Along", "The Lighthouse"
1996: Joy in the Camp "I Know","Go Ask"
1998: All Day Singing at the Dome "When I Get Carried Away"
1998: Kennedy Center Homecoming "One Day at a Time"
1998: Down by the Tabernacle "Old Camp Meeting Days", "Tell Me The Story Of Jesus", "At The Altar"
1998: Rivers Of Joy "Jesus, My Wonderful Lord"
1999: Singin' In My Soul "Jesus Loves Me"
1999: I'll Meet You on the Mountain "I Am Loved"
1999: Sweet, Sweet Spirit "Glory Road" (The Trio)
2000: Oh, My Glory! "Love Is Like A River", "Our Debts Will Be Paid"
2000: Christmas in the Country "Come And See What's Happenin'"
2000: What a Time! "Rise Again"
2000: Irish Homecoming "Close to the Well", "Midnight Cry"
2000: Memphis Homecoming "Wait Till You See Me in My New Home", "Where No One Stands Alone"
2001: London Homecoming "He's On Time"
2001: Journey to the Sky "My Journey to the Sky"
2002: Freedom Band "The Statue Of Liberty"
2002: Let Freedom Ring "God Bless the USA"
2003: Heaven "Canaanland Is Just in Sight"
2003: Red Rocks Homecoming "Then He Said, 'Sing!'", "When The Rains Come"
2003: Rocky Mountain Homecoming "He Must Have Had A Mountain On His Mind"
2004: Whispering Hope "He'd Still Been God", "Precious Jesus"
2005: Hymns "Does Jesus Care?"
2005: Canadian Homecoming "Goodbye, World, Goodbye", "I Can Only Imagine", "I'm Saved"
2005: Live From Toronto "When I Get Carried Away"
2006: Christmas in South Africa "A King Is Coming To Town"
2007: Amazing Grace "Tell Me The Story Of Jesus/I Love To Tell The Story", "Jesus Paid It All"
2007: How Great Thou Art "Thank You"
2007: Love Can Turn The World "If The Lord Wasn't Walking by My Side"
2007: South African Homecoming "Midnight Cry"
2009: Joy in My Heart "Sunday Meetin' Time"

References

External links
www.ivanparker.com – official website

Living people
1957 births
20th-century Christians
21st-century Christians
African-American Christians
American gospel singers
Singers from North Carolina
People from Sanford, North Carolina
Southern gospel performers
20th-century African-American male singers
21st-century African-American male singers